The 2017 European Aesthetic Group Gymnastics Championships, the 2nd edition, was held in Sofia, Bulgaria, from October 21 to 22, 2017 at the Arena Armeec.

Schedule

October 21 Saturday
 16:00 - 16:30 Opening Ceremony
 16:30 - 20:00 Junior and Senior Preliminaries 

October 22 Sunday
 10:35 - 12:35 Junior and Senior Finals
 12:40 - 13:30 Awarding and Closing Ceremony

Medal winners

Medal table

References

External links

2017 in gymnastics
Aesthetic group gymnastics
International gymnastics competitions hosted by Bulgaria
Sports competitions in Sofia
2017 in Bulgarian sport